Joel Silberg (March 30, 1927 – February 18, 2013) was a film, television and stage director and screenwriter in Israel and the United States. He made films in Israel including so-called Bourekas films. He then directed films in the U.S. during the 1980s, including Breakin' and Lambada. Both have been described as exploitation films. In 2008 he received the Lifetime Achievement Award from the Israel Film Academy.

Biography
Silberg was born in Palestine in 1927. He was the son of actor Ben Zion Silberg. He began his career directing at London's Old Vic theater. He co-wrote the Israeli musical film Kazablan (1974).

Breakin''' was shot in Los Angeles and reflects a different style of break dancing and street dance culture than the Bronx, New York film Beat Street. The film, directed by Sam Firstenberg, was a Cannon Films productions. Roger Ebert gave this film 1 1/2 stars, stating that it was a rather predictable story. The sequel, Breakin' 2: Electric Boogaloo, was released 7 months later, and it received poor critical reception. Later on, the subtitle "Electric Boogaloo" would enter the pop-culture lexicon as a snowclone pejorative nickname to denote an archetypical sequel.

Author Kimberly Monteyne referred to films such as Rappin' as "hip hop-oriented exploitation extravaganzas".

Silberg died on February 18, 2013, in Israel, aged 85.

Filmography
 True Story of Palestine (Etz O Palestina) (1962), directed along with Uri Zohar and Nathan Axelrod
 Mishpahat Simhon (1964)
 Haham Gamliel (1973)
 Kuni Lemi in Tel Aviv (1976)
 Hershele (1977)
 Millioner Betzarot (1978)
 Imi Hageneralit (1979)
 Marriage Tel Aviv Style (1979)
 Kuni Lemi in Cairo (1983)
 Breakin' (1984)
 Rappin' (1985)
 Bad Guys (1986), starring Adam Baldwin
 Catch the Heat (also known as Sin escape, 1987), starring Tiana Alexandra and Rod Steiger
 Lambada (1990)
 Prison Heat'' (1993)

References

External links

1927 births
2013 deaths
Film people from Tel Aviv 
Israeli film directors
Israeli television directors
Israeli theatre directors
Israeli male screenwriters
Israeli expatriates in the United States
Burials at Kiryat Shaul Cemetery